Springfield is a census-designated place (CDP) in northwestern Hampshire County in the U.S. state of West Virginia. As of the 2010 census, Springfield had a population of 477. Springfield is located north of Romney along West Virginia Route 28 at its junction with Green Spring Road (West Virginia Secondary Route 1) and Springfield Pike (West Virginia Secondary Route 3). It is currently considering incorporation.

History 
Established on December 16, 1790, at the "Cross Roads" of Hampshire County on the property of William and Samuel Abernethy by an act of the Virginia General Assembly, Springfield was named in commemoration of the Battle of Springfield (1780).

George Washington first visited the Springfield area in 1748 as a member of a party that surveyed the land holdings of Thomas Fairfax, 6th Lord Fairfax of Cameron in the South Branch Potomac River Valley.

In June 1861, the town organized a company of men known as the "Potomac Guards" in support of the Confederacy. The company was under the command of Captain Philip T. Grace.

On August 23, 1861, Springfield played host to an American Civil War skirmish between the Unionists and the Confederates.

Historic Sites 
Today, Springfield is the site of a number of historic private residences dating from the 18th and 19th Centuries.
 63 Springfield Pike (1860), Springfield Pike (CR 3)
 Ridgedale (George W. Washington Farm), Washington Bottom Road (CR 28/3)
 Frenchwood, Route 28 South and Market Street
 The house is currently being restored.  Captain John W. Shouse supposedly built the circa 1855 brick house.
 Springfield United Methodist Church, Vine Street

Churches 
 Assembly of God
 Community Bible Assembly of God Church, Poland Road (CR 28/2)
 Springfield Assembly of God Church, WV Route 28
 Methodist
 Springfield United Methodist Church, Vine Street
 Pentecostal
 Emmanuel House of Prayer, WV Route 28
 Presbyterian
 Springfield Presbyterian Church, Market Street (WV Route 28)

References

External links

 Milleson's Walnut Grove Campground

1790 establishments in Virginia
Census-designated places in Hampshire County, West Virginia
Census-designated places in West Virginia
Hampshire County, West Virginia, in the American Civil War
Populated places established in 1790
American Civil War sites in West Virginia